Mikael Colville-Andersen (born 29 January 1968) is a Canadian-Danish urban designer and urban mobility expert. He was the CEO of Copenhagenize Design Company, which he founded in 2009 in Copenhagen, and he works with cities and governments around the world in coaching them towards becoming more bicycle friendly. He is the host of the urbanism documentary television series The Life-Sized City, which premiered in 2017 on TVOntario and in 2018 on various other international channels including Finland's national broadcaster YLE and Italian broadcaster La Effe. Season 1 of The Life-Sized City was nominated for five Canadian Screen Awards in 2018.

Career

Colville-Andersen is known for his philosophy about simplifying urban planning and urban cycling and how cities should be designed instead of engineered. He is at the forefront of utilising observational techniques inspired by the likes of William H. Whyte for pedestrian and bicycle planning and has been called "the Modern Day Jane Jacobs". He employs anthropology and sociology in his work to develop liveable cities and, in 2012, he spearheaded the largest study of cyclist behaviour ever undertaken – The Choreography of an Urban Intersection – tracking the desire lines of 16,631 cyclists through an intersection in Copenhagen over a 12-hour period.

His approach and philosophy have led to him being referred to as "the Richard Dawkins of cycling" by Peter Walker of The Guardian in 2014 interview with Esquire magazine, "the Pope of urban cycling" by Canadian newspaper La Presse  and Austrian newspaper Der Standard, among others and "the Bieber of urban cycling" in an interview with Canadian Broadcasting Corporation.

Colville-Andersen has been instrumental in orchestrating the global bicycle boom, starting with what was later called "the Photo That Launched a Million Bicycles" in 2006, which led to the Copenhagen Cycle Chic photography and streetstyle blog in 2007. Regarding his early work with the Cycle Chic movement, The Guardian dubbed him "The Sartorialist on Two Wheels".

He coined the phrase cycle chic in 2007, as well as the word Copenhagenize in the same year. He has also coined and popularised other phrases such as Bicycle Urbanism, Viking Biking, Citizen Cyclist and he started The Slow Bicycle Movement in 2008.

Before embarking on a career as an urban designer, he was a film director and screenwriter. His debut feature film, Zakka West (2003), was the first indie film in Denmark and premiered at the Copenhagen International Film Festival. He has written and directed several short films, including the award-winning short Breaking Up (1999), and founded the first pan-European organisation for screenwriters – Euroscreenwriters – in 1997.

As producer for The Danish Broadcasting Corporation (DR) bicentenary website for Hans Christian Andersen, he and his team won the Prix Italia award at the Radiotelevisione Italiana 57th Prix Italia for Best Public Service Website.

In 2013, he made appearances in Edinburgh to help celebrate that city's Bike Week.

In 2014, he was cited as one of the influential urban planners suggesting that radical solutions were needed if improvement was to be seen in respect to congestion problems in the city of York. He has also explained that cycle parking is needed for cities to be cycle-friendly. He was booked as a keynote speaker at the Velo-city Global conference in Adelaide in May 2014.

Exhibitions 

 2008–2010 Dreams on Wheels, international photo exhibition for The Ministry of Foreign Affairs (Denmark)
 2011–2013 Monumental Motion – A Cycling Life in the Danish Capital, Global exhibition for Ministry of Foreign Affairs (Denmark)
 2010–present  The Good City – Visions of a City on the Move, Global exhibition with Bicycle Innovation Lab – Consultant/Contributor

Bibliography 
 Copenhagenize – the definitive guide to global bicycle urbanism, Island Press Publishing Ltd, 2018, 296 pages. .
 Cycle Chic, Thames & Hudson Publishing Ltd, 2012, 288 pages. .
 Cargo Bike Nation, Blurb Publishing, 2013, 194 pages. .
 Cyclists and Cycling Around the World, Fondo Editorial, Pontifical Catholic University of Peru, 2013, Chapter: Branding Cycling – Mainstreaming A Good thing, 334 pages. 
 Backstory 5: Interviews with Screenwriters of the 1990s, University of California Press, 27 October 2009, Chapter: Interview with Jean-Claude Carrière, Editor – Patrick McGilligan, 264 pages,

Awards 

 2012 Brazilian Youth Award for the Escolas de Bicicletas – bicycles in schools project in São Paulo, Brazil

See also 
Cycling advocacy
Bicycle transportation planning and engineering

References

External links 

Copenhagenize.com

1968 births
Danish film directors
Danish male screenwriters
Living people
Film directors from Alberta
People from Fort McMurray
Writers from Alberta
Utility cycling
Cycling advocates
Danish people of Canadian descent
Sustainable transport pioneers